Texas Hotel may refer to:

Texas Hotel Records
Hotel Texas, Fort Worth, Texas